Ndrek Luca (3 September 1927 – 13 January 1993) was an Albanian stage, film and theater actor. He appeared in many films between 1963 and 1991.

He was married to actress and ballerina Mimika Luca.

Filmography 
Viktimat e Tivarit (1996)
Balada e Kurbinit (1990)
    Flaka e maleve
Guri i besës (1986)
Koha nuk pret (1984) (TV) .... Cen Vrapi (Ypsiloni)
Lundrimi i parë (1984).... Qazimi
Fundi i një gjakmarrjeje (1983).... Shpend Gollapi
Qortimet e vjeshtës (1982) .... Rasim Aga
Nusja (1980)
Nga mesi i errësirës (1978) Xha Metja, përgjegjësi i Kaldajes
Udha e shkronjave (1978) (TV) .... Ndrio
Pylli i lirisë (1976) .... Zoti Lam Shllapi
Thirrja (1976) .... Vat Marash Bregasi
Tinguj lufte (1976) .... Selimi
Në fillim të verës (1975) .... Gjeneral Piccioni
Rrugicat që kërkonin diell (1975)..... Gani Herri
Shpërthimi (1974)
Shtigje të luftës (1974) .... Ramazan Daci, komandanti i Milicise
Operacioni Zjarri (1973) .... Pjeter Mustakuqi
 Gjurma (1970) .... Babai i Artanit
Njësiti guerril (1969) .... Shoku Çekan
Prita (1968)
Duel i Heshtur (1967) .... Kapter Rahmiu
Oshëtime në bregdet (1966) .... Jonuz Bruga
Komisari i Dritës (1966) .... Don Pali, Prifti
Detyrë e posaçme (1963) .... Tomori

References

External links 
 

1927 births
1993 deaths
Albanian male film actors
Merited Artists of Albania
20th-century Albanian male actors
People from Mat (municipality)